General elections were held in the Solomon Islands on 5 December 2001. The People's Alliance Party won the most seats, and its leader, Allan Kemakeza became Prime Minister.

Results

References

Elections in the Solomon Islands
Solomon Islands
2001 in the Solomon Islands
December 2001 events in Oceania
Election and referendum articles with incomplete results